Governor's Bridge may refer to  
Governor's Bridge, Belfast, a bridge across the River Lagan in Belfast, Northern Ireland
Governor's Bridge (Isle of Man), a road junction and point on the historic TT races Snaefell Mountain Course
Governor's Bridge, Toronto, a neighborhood in Toronto
Governor's Bridge (Patuxent River), a bridge dating to the colonial-era in Maryland